Nikolaos Zorbas (1844–1920), was a Greek soldier, most notable as the nominal leader of the Military League which organized the Goudi coup in 1909.

Life 
His family was from Magnesia in Asia Minor and he was born in Athens. After studying at the Hellenic Military Academy, he finished his studies in France and Belgium. He fought during the Greco-Turkish War (1897), and in 1909, as a colonel, he was chosen as the leader of the clandestine Military League. After the league organized the Goudi coup in August 1909, he was appointed Minister of Military Affairs in the Stephanos Dragoumis government and retired in 1911 as a Major General.

Zorbas died in Athens.

1844 births
1920 deaths
Hellenic Army officers
Greek colonels
Ministers of Military Affairs of Greece
Recipients of the Legion of Honour
Greek military personnel of the Greco-Turkish War (1897)
Military personnel from Athens